Avahteriya is Maldivian comedy drama web series written and directed by Yoosuf Shafeeu. It stars Ali Azim, Ibrahim Jihad, Ahmed Azmeel, Ahmed Easa, Ansham Mohamed, Aminath Noora, Ahmed Ziya and Ali Usam in main roles. The pilot episode of the series was released on 13 April 2021.

Cast and characters
 Ali Azim as Ibrahim Solih
 Ibrahim Jihad as Dr. Algeen
 Ahmed Azmeel as Jabir
 Ahmed Easa as Raqeeb
 Ansham Mohamed as Fiyaza
 Aminath Noora as Mareena
 Ahmed Ziya as Lucky
 Ali Usam as Raseen

Episodes

Development
The series was developed on the working title "Thedhey An'bin Reechey" which was later changed to "Avahteriya". The pilot episode was released before completion of filming for the whole project. Soon after, the government imposed a lockdown due to COVID-19 pandemic which further delayed pre-production since majority of the scenes were scheduled to be shot in Hulhumale'.

Release and reception
The series was made available for streaming through Baiskoafu application during Ramadan 1442. The pilot episode of the series was released on 13 April 2021, to positive reviews from critics. Ahmed Hameed Adam reviewing from Avas was generally in favor of the film and noted Jihad and Easa's performances as the highlights of film "As an experienced actor, Jihad has delivered an outstanding performance with a different taste".

References

Serial drama television series
Maldivian television shows
Maldivian web series